The Portland Sanitarium Nurses' Quarters, located at 6012 Southeast Yamhill Street in southeast Portland, Oregon, are listed on the National Register of Historic Places. The back portion of the building was built in 1928 and is a neoclassical brick style; the 4-story front portion was built in 1946 in an International style. It was designed by Claussen and Claussen

The building housed nurses for the former, adjacent, Portland Adventist Sanitarium. The Sanitarium was founded in ca. 1895 when Seventh Day Adventist rented an eight-bedroom mansion from Simeon Reed, turning it into the six-patient sanitarium. By 1897 the facility was owned by the Seventh Day Adventist Church, who founded the vegetarian Portland Sanitarium Food Company, a branch of the Battle Creek Sanitarium Food Company. A vegetarian restaurant also opened on the site.

Until it was closed for construction, the Nurses' Quarters building held the Institute for International Christian Communication's WorldView Center, a missionary training program. The program split in 2018, with the training center being renamed to CultureBound. The building was sold then.

The building went through land use review/rezoning in 2014 to be turned into 75 micro-apartments. The construction also included seismic retrofits. It will be called "Tabor Commons Apartments" when it reopens in ca. 2020.

See also
 National Register of Historic Places listings in Southeast Portland, Oregon

References

External links
 

Mount Tabor, Portland, Oregon
National Register of Historic Places in Portland, Oregon